James Cumming may refer to:

 James Cumming (chemist) (1777–1861), professor of chemistry at the University of Cambridge
 James Cumming (architect), architect of the Norwood Baptist Church (1869) in Adelaide, South Australia
 James Cumming (New Zealand politician) (1879–1971), member of the New Zealand Legislative Council
 James Cumming (footballer) (1891–?), Scottish footballer
 James Cumming (artist) (1922–1991), Scottish painter and lecturer
 James Cumming (Canadian politician) (born 1961), MP
 James Cumming (British Naval officer), British Royal Navy admiral

See also
 James Cummings (disambiguation)